The following events occurred in January 1963:

January 1, 1963 (Tuesday)
The #1 ranked (and unofficial college football champion) USC Trojans and the #2 Wisconsin Badgers met in the 1963 Rose Bowl before a crowd of 98,696 people. At the time, American college football's national championship was determined by the AP and UPI polls taken at the end of the regular season. The nation's first and second ranked teams happened to meet by virtue of being the respective champions of the Big Six Conference (now the Pac-12 Conference) and the Big Ten Conference.  USC won 42-37, holding off a fourth quarter, 23-point rally by Wisconsin.
Osamu Tezuka's Tetsuwan Atomu (Astro Boy), Japan's first serialized animated series based on the popular manga, was broadcast for the first time.  It premiered on Japanese television station Fuji TV.
The U.S. city of Chesapeake, Virginia, was created from a merger of the city of South Norfolk and the remainder of surrounding Norfolk County, Virginia.
Died: 
Dr. Gilbert Bogle, 38, research scientist with the Australia's governmental scientific agency, CSIRO, found dead along with Margaret Chandler, the wife of a colleague.  Both were apparently overcome by poisonous fumes in bushland near the Lane Cove River, Sydney.
Robert S. Kerr, 66, U.S. Senator for Oklahoma since 1948 and oil multi-millionaire, nicknamed "the uncrowned King of the Senate".    Kerr, who had been in Doctors Hospital in Washington D.C. for three weeks from a "virus ailment", suffred a fatal heart attack "while sitting on a bed talking to his physician."

January 2, 1963 (Wednesday)
The Battle of Ap Bac in South Vietnam began, and was the first time that Viet Cong forces stood and fought against a major South Vietnamese attack. At the outset, Viet Cong ground fire shot down a United States Army UH-1 attack helicopter and four U.S. Army CH-21 transport helicopters as they arrived at their landing zone. Republic of Vietnam Air Force C-123 Provider transport planes dropped about 300 South Vietnamese paratroopers later in the day. Despite outnumbering the Viet Cong 4 to 1, and having American armor, artillery and helicopters, "what should have been an ARVN victory turned into an exercise of everything that was wrong with the South Vietnamese army".
Seventeen people were killed in an explosion at the Home Packing Company in Terre Haute, Indiana.

Died:  
Dick Powell, 58, American actor and singer (lymphoma).  Powell's death from lymphatic cancer came a day after his pre-recorded introduction to the stories of his anthology series, The Dick Powell Show had been telecast.  The show would continue for the rest of the season under the same name with various celebrities hosting, but without Powell's introductions.  
Jack Carson, 52, Canadian-American comedian and character actor, of stomach cancer

January 3, 1963 (Thursday)
Contact with the American Mariner 2 space probe was lost after 128 days of data transmitted from the planet Venus and from the Sun. Attempts from Earth on January 8 to restart transmission, failed, and the craft was not found during searches made on May 28 and August 16.
Thirty-two Soviet civilians from Siberia forced their way into the United States Embassy in Moscow, describing themselves as "persecuted Christians" and seeking political asylum. After embassy officials told the group that they could not stay, the people were placed on a bus and taken away by Moscow police. The 6 men, 12 women and 14 children were sent back to Chernogorsk that evening, after the U.S. Embassy received assurances that the group would get "good treatment".
The "Big Freeze of 1963" in the United Kingdom caused the cancellation of all but three of the scheduled third round matches of the 1962–63 FA Cup. The blizzard was "the worst snow in Britain's 100 years of recorded weather history".
At a press conference in Ottawa, U.S. Army General Lauris Norstad's answer to a reporter's question set in motion a series of events that would bring the downfall of Canadian Prime Minister John Diefenbaker. General Norstad had recently retired as NATO's Supreme Allied Commander in Europe. Asked by Charles Lynch of the Ottawa Citizen whether he was saying that Canada's refusal to accept nuclear weapons for its airplanes meant "that she is not actually fulfilling her NATO commitments", General Norstad said, "I believe that is right."
Tentative plans were made by NASA to extend the Mercury-Atlas 9 (MA-9) flight from 18 to 22 orbits.

January 4, 1963 (Friday)
An express train crashed into the rear of a standing passenger train at Meghnagar, Madhya Pradesh, India. Eight passenger cars were crushed or caught fire after an explosion. At least 38 people were confirmed dead and 90 injured.
The Soviet Union successfully launched Luna E-6 No.2, but a malfunction kept the craft from going beyond low Earth orbit. Seven days later, the decay of the orbit would cause the satellite to re-enter and burn in the atmosphere.
Manned Spacecraft Center directed McDonnell to study requirements for a spacecraft capable of performing rendezvous experiments on the second and third Project Gemini flights. The experimental package would weigh  and would include an L-band radar target, flashing light, battery power supply, and antenna systems. On the second flight, a one-day mission, the experiment was to be performed open-loop, probably optically - the astronaut would observe the target and maneuver the spacecraft to rendezvous with it. On the third flight, a seven-day mission, the experiment was to be performed closed-loop, with spacecraft maneuvers controlled automatically by the data it received from its instruments.
Born: Till Lindemann, German singer, songwriter and poet (Rammstein), in Leipzig, East Germany 
Died: Yusuf Izzuddin Shah, 72, Sultan of Perak since 1948. He received the posthumous title of "Marhum Ghafarullah".

January 5, 1963 (Saturday)
In New York City, the musical Camelot closed after 873 performances and a Broadway run of more than two years.
The military government of Peru began a nationwide roundup of suspected Communists, arresting more than 300 people accused of plotting subversion.
Died:  
Stanisław Jaros, 28, Polish electrician and would-be political assassin, executed by hanging
Erik Strandmark, 43, Swedish film actor, killed in a plane crash

January 6, 1963 (Sunday)
The Shah of Iran launched his six-point White Revolution for ending illiteracy, reforming agriculture and industry, advancing women's suffrage, and nationalization of forests.
Voters in Brazil overwhelmingly rejected a parliamentary form of government in a plebiscite, and approved a strong executive system under President João Goulart. Only 2,073,582 were in favor of retaining the ministerial system, while 9,457,448 voted against it.
The British musical Oliver!, based on the Charles Dickens novel Oliver Twist, made its debut on Broadway, at the Imperial Theatre, and ran for 774 performances.
Born:
Tony Halme, Finnish professional wrestler who worked for WWF (now WWE) and MMA (died 2010, suicide)
Paul Kipkoech, Kenyan long-distance runner, in Kapsabet (died 1995)

January 7, 1963 (Monday)
The Soviet national airline Aeroflot launched its service to Cuba from Moscow to Havana, using Tu-114 turboprop airplanes.

The price of mailing a letter in the United States rose from four cents to five cents, with a 25% increase in the price of a first class stamp. The increase was the first since August 1, 1958, when the price had changed from three cents to four.
Final acceptance tests were conducted on the Mercury space flight simulator at Ellington Field, Texas. This equipment, formerly known as the procedures trainer, was originally installed at Langley Field and was moved from that area to Houston. Personnel of the Manned Spacecraft Center and the Farrand Optical Company conducted the acceptance tests.

January 8, 1963 (Tuesday)
The Spanish coaster Nueva Guinea exploded and sank off Santa Cruz de La Palma, Canary Islands. One crew member was reported missing and two injured.

Leonardo da Vinci's Mona Lisa was exhibited in the United States for the first time, at the National Gallery of Art in Washington, D.C., in an event attended by President Kennedy and 2,000 other guests of honor. The masterpiece was on view for 27 days in Washington, during which 674,000 visitors came to see it, then moved on to the Metropolitan Museum of Art in New York from February 6 to March 4.
On January 8 and 9, representatives of Manned Spacecraft Center, NASA Headquarters, Flight Research Center, Langley Research Center, and Ames Research Center conducted a Design Engineering Inspection of the advanced trainer for the Paraglider Development Program, Phase II-B(1). North American Aviation received 36 requests for alterations.
On January 8 and 9, Manned Spacecraft Center outlined requirements for McDonnell to consider concerning Gemini aborts in orbit. These included onboard controlled reentry for all aborts, except in the event of guidance and control system failure; onboard selection of one of the emergency abort target areas; navigational accuracy to a  radius error at the point of impact; and crew capability to eject from the spacecraft with the paraglider deployed.

January 9, 1963 (Wednesday)
A relatively rare total penumbral lunar eclipse took place, with the Moon passing entirely within the penumbral shadow without entering the darker umbral shadow.
Flight Operations Division outlined detailed requirements for the remote stations of the Gemini worldwide tracking network. Each station would need five consoles: Gemini system, Agena system, command, aeromedical, and maintenance and operations. The Gemini and Agena consoles would have 42 analog display meters and 40 on/off indicators.
John W. Lewis, Jr., was elected Speaker of the Illinois House of Representatives.

January 10, 1963 (Thursday)
The space program of Soviet Air Forces selected its second generation of cosmonauts, with 15 men training for future Soyuz missions, including Vladimir Shatalov (Soyuz 4, 8, and 10), Anatoly Filipchenko (Soyuz 7 and 16), Georgy Dobrovolsky (Soyuz 11), Yury Artyukhin (Soyuz 14), Lev Dyomin (Soyuz 15), Aleksei Gubarev (Soyuz 17 and 28) and Vitaly Zholobov (Soyuz 21). 
Duma Nokwe, the Secretary-General of the African National Congress, fled from South Africa before he could be arrested under the nation's Sabotage Act.
The American film Cape Fear, directed by J. Lee Thompson, was finally released in the United Kingdom, but only after Thompson agreed to 161 cuts of dialogue ordered by the censors of the British Board of Film Classification in order to avoid an "X" rating.
Between January 10 and 16, Mercury spacecraft No. 9A was cycled through Project Orbit Mission Runs 108, 108A, and 108B in the test facilities of the McDonnell Aircraft Corporation. These runs were scheduled for full-scale missions and proposed to demonstrate a 1-day mission capability. In other words, plans called for the operation of spacecraft systems according to the MA-9 flight plan, including the use of onboard supplies of electrical power, oxygen, coolant water, and hydrogen peroxide. Hardlines were used to simulate the astronaut control functions. Runs 108A and 108B were necessitated by an attempt to achieve the prescribed mission as cabin pressure difficulties forced a halt to the reaction control system thrust chamber operations portion of Run 108, although the other systems began to operate as programed. Later in 108 difficulties developed in the liquid nitrogen flow and leaks were suspected. Because of these thermal simulation problems, the test was stopped after 1 hour. Little improvement was recorded in Run 108A as leaks developed in the oxygen servicing line. In addition, cabin pressures were reduced to one psia, and attempts to repressurize were unsuccessful. The run was terminated. Despite the fact that Run 108B met with numerous problems - cabin pressure and suit temperature - a 40-hour and 30-minute test was completed.
Representatives of Manned Spacecraft Center (MSC), McDonnell, and the Eagle-Picher Company, Joplin, Missouri, met to review plans for developing and testing the silver-zinc batteries for the Gemini spacecraft. McDonnell had selected Eagle-Picher as vendor for the batteries about 6 months earlier. Current plans called for five batteries to provide part of the primary (main bus) electrical power requirements during launch, and all primary electrical power for one orbit, reentry, and the postlanding period. Three additional high-discharge-rate batteries, isolated electrically and mechanically from the main batteries, provided power to control functioning relays and solenoids. Eagle-Picher completed a test plan proposal on February 9. On February 21, MSC directed McDonnell to use four batteries instead of five for main bus power on spacecraft Nos. 2 and up, after McDonnell's analysis of battery power requirements disclosed that a four-battery installation, if closely monitored, would be adequate.
Titan II flight N-15 was launched from Cape Canaveral. It was the tenth in the series of Titan II research and development flights, and the second to achieve significantly reduced levels of longitudinal oscillations by means of propellant tank pressurization.
Emmett Hall, the Chief Justice of the Saskatchewan Supreme Court, was sworn in as a justice of the Supreme Court of Canada.
Died: Tadeusz Szeligowski, 66, Polish composer, educator, lawyer and music organizer

January 11, 1963 (Friday)
Two people in China, an 18-year-old fisherman and his seven-year-old younger brother, were fatally injured after the man took home a piece of radioactive cobalt-60 that had been dropped on farmland owned by the Anhui Agricultural University in Hefei. The cobalt-60 radiation was 43 petabecquerel; over a period of almost nine days before the sample was recovered, the man was exposed to 806 grays of radiation and died on January 23; his brother died two days later from exposure to 40 grays.
The Beatles released "Please Please Me" in the United Kingdom, with "Ask Me Why" as the B-side. The group would perform the song on TV two days later on the ITV program Thank Your Lucky Stars. "Please Please Me" would become the first Beatles' single to reach #1 in the UK.
The Project Engineering Field Office (located at Cape Canaveral) of the Mercury Project Office reported on the number of changes made to Mercury spacecraft 20 (MA-9) as of that date after its receipt at Cape Canaveral from McDonnell in St. Louis. There were 17 specific changes, as follows: one to the reaction control system, one to the environmental control system, seven to the electrical and sequential systems, and eight to the console panels.
To stimulate contractor employees to better performance, Gemini Project Office Manager James A. Chamberlin suggested that astronauts visit with workers at various contractors' plants. Donald K. Slayton, Astronaut Activities Office, informed Chamberlin that such visits would be made, beginning with the Martin Company in February 1963.

January 12, 1963 (Saturday)
At the Australian National Athletics Championships in her home town of Perth, Western Australia, Margaret Burvill set a new world record of 23.2 seconds in the women's 220 yard dash.
Born: Nando Reis, Brazilian musician and producer, in São Paulo

January 13, 1963 (Sunday)
Sylvanus Olympio, the 60-year-old President of Togo, was assassinated.  Olympio apparently was seeking refuge at the United States Embassy in Lomé, next to the presidential palace.  U.S. Ambassador Leon B. Poullada said that "the body, riddled by several bullets, was found crumpled only three feet from the embassy's gate".  The President's killer, Colonel Étienne Eyadéma, would assume the presidency in 1967 and hold the office until his death in 2005.

January 14, 1963 (Monday)
A fire broke out in the engine room of the tourist ferryboat, Djandji Raja, as it was traversing the Toba Lake in North Sumatra, then caused a fuel tank to explode. Of the 250 people on board, 105 were burned to death. Word of the accident did not reach Jakarta until five days later.
France's President Charles de Gaulle indicated in a press conference that he would veto the application of the United Kingdom to join the Common Market.
The Rolling Stones, with Mick Jagger, guitarists Keith Richards and Brian Jones, pianist Ian Stewart, bass guitarist Bill Wyman and drummer Charlie Watts first played together as a group, with a performance at The Flamingo Club in the West End of London.  
A month before she would commit suicide, Sylvia Plath was able to realize the publication of her first and only novel, The Bell Jar, by the Heinemann company.
The locomotive Flying Scotsman (British Railways No. 60103) made its last scheduled run, before going into the hands of Alan Pegler for preservation.
George C. Wallace was sworn in as Governor of Alabama. In his inaugural speech, he defiantly proclaimed "In the name of the greatest people that have ever trod this earth, I draw the line in the dust and toss the gauntlet before the feet of tyranny, and I say 'segregation now, segregation tomorrow, and segregation forever.' Let us send this message back to Washington, that from this day we are standing up, and the heel of tyranny does not fit the neck of an upright man."
Mercury spacecraft 15A was redesignated 15B and allocated as a backup for the MA-9 mission. In the event Mercury-Atlas 10 (MA-10) were flown, 15B would be the prime spacecraft. Modifications were started immediately with respect to the hand controller rigging procedures, pitch and yaw control valves, and other technical changes.
The Manned Spacecraft Center presented the proposal to NASA Headquarters that the ground light visibility experiment of Wally Schirra's flight (MA-8) be repeated for the Mercury-Atlas 9 (MA-9) mission. Objectives were to determine the capability of an astronaut visually to acquire a ground light of known intensity while in orbit and to evaluate the visibility of the light as seen from the spacecraft at varying distances from the light source. Possibly at some later date such lights could be used as a signal to provide spacecraft of advanced programs with an earth reference point. This experiment was integrated as a part of the MA-9 mission.
In the opinion of Flight Operations Division's Project Gemini working group: "One of the biggest problem areas seems to be the [spacecraft] on-board computer; exactly what is it going to do; what is its sequence of operation; what does it need from the ground computer complex and how often; exactly how is it used by astronauts; what is the job of the on-board computer for early missions?"
Manned Spacecraft Center (MSC) assumed complete responsibility for the Gemini target vehicle program from Marshall Space Flight Center following a meeting between MSC and Marshall on January 11 establishing procedures for the transfer. Marshall was to continue to participate actively in an advisory capacity until March 1 and thereafter as technical consultant to MSC upon request. All other NASA Atlas-Agena programs were transferred to Lewis Research Center in a move aimed at freeing Marshall to concentrate on Saturn launch vehicle development and consolidating Atlas launch vehicle technology at Lewis. NASA Headquarters had decided to effect the transfer on October 12, 1962.

January 15, 1963 (Tuesday)
In his State of the Union address at a joint session of the U.S. Congress, President Kennedy called on Congress to pass legislation to lower income taxes as a means of stimulating the economy.  Kennedy called for individual tax rates, ranging from 20% to as much as 91% for the highest brackets, to be cut to a range of 14% to 65%, and for the corporate rate to be cut from 52% to 47%.  The bill would not become law until after Kennedy's death, signed by his successor, President Lyndon B. Johnson on February 26, 1964.
The Katanga Crisis came to an end as Moise Tshombe declared the end of his attempt to secede from the Congo, and ordered a surrender to the United Nations forces.
Forty-seven workmen in India were killed, and another 62 injured, while working underground at Naraj, in the Orissa state.
The 27th Legislative Assembly of Quebec began its first session.
Born: Erling Kagge, Norwegian polar explorer

January 16, 1963 (Wednesday)
Saudi Arabia and the United Kingdom resumed diplomatic relations, more than six years after the two nations had closed their embassies during the 1956 Suez Crisis.
Soviet Premier Nikita Khrushchev made a visit to the Berlin Wall from the East Berlin side, then delivered an address to the Communist leadership of East Germany at the SED Party Congress.  Khrushchev stated bluntly that the Wall had accomplished its purpose of stemming the exodus of citizens from the nation and stabilized the East German economy, and added that further Soviet economic assistance would not be forthcoming.  "Neither God nor the devil will give you bread or butter if you do not manage it with your own hands," Khrushchev said, adding that East Germany "must not expect alms from some rich uncle".
The 1963 NBA All-Star Game was played at Los Angeles Memorial Sports Arena.  The Eastern Conference team beat the Western Conference, 115-108.
Born: James May, British television presenter, in Bristol
Died: 
Cesare Fantoni, 57, Italian film actor
Ike Quebec, 44, American jazz saxophonist
Gilardo Gilardi, 73, Argentine composer, pianist, and conductor

January 17, 1963 (Thursday)
The Skyvan passenger and cargo carrying aircraft, designed in Northern Ireland by the Short Brothers aerospace company, made its first flight, taking off from its Sydenham, Belfast airfield.
U.S. Attorney General Robert F. Kennedy made "his first, and last, appearance as a lawyer in a courtroom", participating in the oral argument before the United States Supreme Court in Gray v. Sanders, regarding whether the county-unit system of voting that had been used in the U.S. State of Georgia was unconstitutional.
Asked by a Congressional committee if NASA planned another Mercury flight after MA-9, Dr. Robert C. Seamans stated, in effect, that schedules for the original Mercury program and the 1-day orbital effort were presumed to be completed in fiscal year 1963. If sufficient test data were not accumulated in the MA-9 flight, backup launch vehicles and spacecraft were available to fulfill requirements.
NASA Administrator James E. Webb and Secretary of Defense Robert S. McNamara signed a new agreement on Department of Defense (DOD) and NASA management responsibilities in the Cape Canaveral area. The U.S. Air Force would continue as single manager of the Atlantic Missile Range and host agency at the  Cape Canaveral launch area. NASA's Launch Operations Center would manage and serve as host agency at the Merritt Island Launch Area, north and west of existing DOD installations. DOD and NASA would each be responsible for their own logistics and administration in their respective areas. Specific mission functions - e.g., preparation, checkout, launch, test evaluation - would be performed by each agency in its own behalf, regardless of location. DOD retained certain fundamental range functions, including scheduling, flight safety, search and rescue operations, and downrange airlift and station operation.
Died: 
Johannes Sejersted Bødtker, 83, Norwegian banker and patron of the arts
Arthur Edward Moore, 86, Australian politician, Premier of Queensland 1929-1932

January 18, 1963 (Friday)
The French automobile manufacturer Simca was taken over by the American automaker Chrysler, which purchased a controlling interest of the 18,000 employee company in order to increase its presence in Europe.
Severe winter conditions in the Netherlands eliminated 9,225 of the 9,294 ice skating participants in the nation's annual "eleven city tour", the elfstedentocht.  Only 69 people finished the  round trip that starts and ends at Leeuwarden by way of Sneek, IJlst, Sloten, Stavoren, Hindeloopen, Workum, Bolsward, Harlingen, Franeker, and Dokkum
Died: 
Hugh Gaitskell, 56, the leader of Britain's Labour Party, died of kidney failure caused by lupus erythematosus.
Edward Titchmarsh, 63, British mathematician who contributed the Titchmarsh convolution theorem, the Titchmarsh theorem on Hilbert transform, the Titchmarsh–Kodaira formula on differential equations, and the Brun–Titchmarsh theorem
Johnny Moyes, 70, Australian cricketer and radio commentator

January 19, 1963 (Saturday)
Hermine Braunsteiner, formerly a supervising warden at the Ravensbrück concentration camp, and known as "The Stomping Mare" because of her use of steel-studded jackboots to kick inmates, became a naturalized citizen of the United States. Acting on a tip from Nazi hunter Simon Wiesenthal, The New York Times would expose her past in 1964. Her citizenship would be revoked in 1971, and in 1973 she would be extradited to West Germany for trial as a war criminal. In 1981, she would be sentenced to life imprisonment. Released after 15 years for health reasons (including, ironically, the amputation of her leg), she would die in 1999.
Canadian radio station CKST (then known as CJJC) broadcast for the first time.
Born: 
Martin Bashir, British journalist, in Wandsworth, South London
Caron Wheeler, British soul singer, in London
Died: Thomas Kennedy, 75, American labor leader, President of the United Mine Workers of America since 1960

January 20, 1963 (Sunday)
The "Konfrontasi", literally a confrontation between Indonesia and the proposed union of the former British colonies of Malaya, Sarawak, Sabah and Singapore as the Federation of Malaysia, was declared in a speech by the Indonesian Foreign Minister, Subandrio.  Indonesia shared a border with Sarawak and Sabah on the island of Borneo, and opposed their incorporation into a larger nation.  Although avoiding a direct war with the United Kingdom, which maintained bases on Borneo, Indonesia engaged in skirmishes along the Sarawak border, and 37 bombings at various locations in Singapore.  The war would come to an end with the signing of a treaty on August 11, 1966, after the overthrow of Indonesia's President Sukarno by General Suharto.
Father Vincent Pallotti (1796-1850), founder in 1835 of the Roman Catholic organization called the Pallottines, was elevated to sainthood by Pope John XXIII.
Born: Ingeborga Dapkūnaitė, Lithuanian actress, in Vilnius
Died: Avra Theodoropoulou, 72, Greek women's rights activist

January 21, 1963 (Monday)
Television Singapura started television test transmissions.
After reviewing the MA-9 spacecraft system and mission rules, the Simulations Section reported the drafting of a simulator training plan for the flight. Approximately 20 launch reentry missions were scheduled, plus variations of these missions as necessary. Instruction during the simulated orbital period consisted of attitude and fuel consumption studies, and from time to time fault insertions would be integrated to provide a complete range of activities covering all mission objectives. By the end of April 1963, pilot Gordon Cooper and backup pilot Alan Shepard had accumulated 50 hours in the simulators.
James E. Webb, Administrator of NASA, and Robert S. McNamara, Secretary of Defense, concluded a major policy agreement defining the roles of NASA and Department of Defense (DOD) in Project Gemini. The agreement provided for the establishment of a joint NASA-DOD Gemini Program Planning Board. The board would plan experiments, conduct flight tests, and analyze and disseminate results. NASA would continue to manage Project Gemini, while DOD would take part in Gemini development, pilot training, preflight checkout, launch, and flight operations, and would be specifically responsible for the Titan II launch vehicle and the Atlas-Agena target vehicle. DOD would also contribute funds toward the attainment of Gemini objectives.
Born: Hakeem Olajuwon, Nigerian-American NBA player and Basketball Hall of Famer, in Lagos

January 22, 1963 (Tuesday)
In Paris, President Charles de Gaulle of France and Chancellor Konrad Adenauer of West Germany signed the Elysée Treaty, the first bilateral pact between the French and German nations. "In the century prior to the treaty", it would be observed later, "France and Germany had been on opposite sides in three wars: the Franco-Prussian War, World War I and World War II." The treaty provided for the nations' leaders to meet at least twice a year, and the foreign and defense ministers to meet four times a year.
McDonnell Aircraft Corporation reported to the Manned Spacecraft Center on a study conducted to ascertain temperature effects on the Mercury spacecraft as a result of white paint patch experiments. Differences in spacecraft structural points prevented the tests from being conclusive, but the recorded temperatures during the flights were different enough to determine that the painted surfaces were cooler at points directly beneath the patch and on a corresponding point inside the spacecraft. According to McDonnell's analytical calculations, white painted spacecraft were advantageous for extended-range missions. However, McDonnell pointed out the necessity for further study, since one limited test was not conclusive.
In a Gemini electrical systems coordination meeting at Manned Spacecraft Center, results of operating the first fuel cell section were reported: a fuel cell stack had failed and the resultant fire had burned a hole through the case. Another section was being assembled from stacks incorporating thicker ion-exchange membranes. One such stack, of six fuel cells, had operated for 707 hours within specification limits, and after 875 hours was five percent below specified voltage; a similar stack was well within specification after operating 435 hours.
North American received a letter contract for Phase III, Part I, of the Paraglider Development Program, to produce a Gemini paraglider landing system. This contract was subsequently incorporated as Change No. 6 to Contract NAS 9-539, Phase II-B(1) of the Paraglider Development Program.
Addressing an Institute of Aerospace Science meeting in New York, George von Tiesenhausen, Chief of Future Studies at NASA's Launch Operations Center, stated that by 1970 the United States would need an orbiting space station to launch and repair spacecraft. The station could also serve as a crewed scientific laboratory. The sections would be joined once in orbit.
Died: Ralph Hudson, 42, American murderer, became the last person to be executed by the U.S. state of New Jersey. Hudson had stabbed his wife to death after getting an early release for Christmas.

January 23, 1963 (Wednesday)
British MI5 agent Kim Philby, who was secretly working for the Soviet Union as a double agent for the NKVD, disappeared after having a drink with a colleague at a hotel in Beirut. Five months later, on July 30, the Soviet Union would announce that he had been given asylum there and would confirm his identity as a Soviet spy.
Three months after the U.S. and the U.S.S.R. almost went to war during the Cuban Missile Crisis, the Turkish government announced the deactivation and removal of its arsenal of American-supplied Jupiter missiles from Turkey, six days after Italy had announced their phaseout of the Jupiters. The missiles in Turkey, armed with nuclear warheads and within striking distance of cities in the Soviet Union, had been one of the reasons for the Soviet placement of missiles in Cuba.
The Sino-Indian War formally came to an end after India's Parliament, the Lok Sabha, voted to approve the terms for peace with China, concluding the war between the world's two most populous nations.  China had withdrawn its troops the previous month.
The first democratic elections in the history of Kuwait took place, although limited to men only. There were 205 candidates for the 50 available seats in the National Assembly.
A strike began at the Florida East Coast Railway and would become the longest in railroad history, not ending until nine years later on February 1, 1972.  Strike activity would not completely end until April 9, 1976.
The Pascagoula (MS) Chronicle, whose publisher, Ira B. Harkey Jr., was alone among white newspaper owners in Mississippi in taking a stand against racial segregation, was saved from financial ruin when a newsman for the New York City radio station WNEW urged his listeners to subscribe to the paper. Dee Finch called attention to Harkey's courageous stand and loss of revenue, said that he was going to buy a subscription to the Chronicle, and invited others to do likewise.  In the first day, 750 New Yorkers pledged to subscribe, and advertising agencies announced plans to encourage their clients to buy ad space in the newspaper.
Born: Su Tong (pseudonym for Tong Zhonggui), Chinese author, in Suzhou
Died: 
Gustave Garrigou, 78, French racing cyclist, 1911 Tour de France winner
Muhammad Ali Bogra, 53, Foreign Minister of Pakistan and former Prime Minister

January 24, 1963 (Thursday)
A B-52C bomber, carrying two nuclear weapons and on airborne alert for the U.S. Air Force, lost its vertical stabilizer in turbulence, broke up in midair and crashed into Elephant Mountain in Piscataquis County, Maine.  Seven of the nine-man crew were killed, and one of the unarmed nuclear bombs fell from the plane and broke apart on impact on a farm.  A part of that bomb, containing enriched uranium, was never located, "even though the waterlogged farmland in the vicinity was excavated to a depth of 50 feet".
The Italian cargo ship Graziella was driven ashore in a gale at Tangier, Morocco.
Died: Otto Harbach, 89, American lyricist and librettist

January 25, 1963 (Friday)
In a major address to the Canadian House of Commons on whether Canada would or would not accept nuclear weapons for its combat aircraft, Prime Minister Diefenbaker made a speech that subsequent historians would describe as "most baffling", "next to incomprehensible" and "long, evasive, rambling... incoherent statements".  "However," the Canadian Press (CP) would write, "at no point in his two-hour speech did Mr. Diefenbaker say definitely whether Canada has rejected or accepted a nuclear role for Canadian forces."
New Zealand physician, military surgeon, statesman and athlete Arthur Porritt was created a baronet.
The lowest temperature in Kosovo was recorded in the city of Gjilan, −32.5 °C (−26.5 °F).
Died: Sir Isaac Shoenberg, 78, Russian-born British inventor who pioneered the development of the all electronic form of television.

January 26, 1963 (Saturday)
Australia Day shootings: In Perth, Australia, two people were shot dead, and others injured, by multiple murderer Eric Edgar Cooke.
The Shah of Iran's White Revolution of six reforms, including the right of women to vote, was overwhelmingly approved in a nationwide referendum by the six million male voters; the election was believed by observers to have been fraudulent.
The "British Pools Panel" was first used to address instances, in the betting on Britain's soccer football matches, where a scheduled match was postponed. On the first weekend, when 55 games were called off because of freezing temperatures, the panel of former players and referees "predicted" what the results would have been had the match not been postponed, essentially making up results that would be accepted for determining whether a betting line had been picked successfully. Originally, the five-member Panel only intervened if 30 or more matches were called off; later, the panel would convene if any match were postponed.
The Rules Committee for American organized baseball voted unanimously (9-0) to increase the size of the strike zone beginning with the 1963 season. The new rule specified that a pitched ball was a strike if it traveled in the "space above home plate which is between the top of the batter's shoulders and his knees when he assumes his natural position". The prior rule in 1950 measured the zone from a player's armpits to the top of the knees. Although the number of walks decreased, so did the number of home runs, particularly in the American League, where attendance declined.
Specialty assignments were announced by the Manned Spacecraft Center for its astronaut team: L. Gordon Cooper, Alan B. Shepard, pilot phases of Project Mercury; Virgil I. Grissom, Project Gemini; John H. Glenn, Project Apollo; M. Scott Carpenter, lunar excursion training; Walter M. Schirra, Gemini and Apollo operations and training; Donald K. Slayton, remained in duties assigned in September 1962 as Coordinator of Astronaut Activities. These assignments superseded those of July 1959. Assignments of the nine new flight-crew members selected on September 17, 1962, were as follows: Neil A. Armstrong, trainers and simulators; Frank Borman, boosters; Charles Conrad, Jr., cockpit layout and systems integration; James A. Lovell, Jr., recovery systems; James A. McDivitt, guidance and navigation; Elliot M. See, Jr., electrical, sequential, and mission planning; Thomas P. Stafford, communications, instrumentation, and range integration; Edward H. White II, flight control systems; and John W. Young, environmental control systems, personal and survival equipment.
Born: José Mourinho, Portuguese-born soccer football team manager who has won league titles in four countries, for F.C. Porto in Portugal (2003, 2004); Chelsea F.C. in England (2005, 2006); Inter Milan in Italy (2009, 2010); and Real Madrid C.F. in Spain (2012), as well as two UEFA championships (2004, 2010); in Setúbal
Died:
Sir Maurice Hankey, 85, the first person to hold the post of Cabinet Secretary in the United Kingdom when it was created in 1916.
Ole Olsen, 70, American vaudeville comedian, and half of the Olsen and Johnson comedy team. In 1938, Olsen and Chic Johnson had created the musical, and later the 1941 film, Hellzapoppin'

January 27, 1963 (Sunday)
John A. Powers, Public Affairs Officer, Manned Spacecraft Center, told an audience of Texas Associated Press managing editors that Gordon Cooper's MA-9 flight might go as many as 22 orbits, lasting 34 hours.
The Aero Commander 1121 business jet made its first test flight, at Norman, Oklahoma. In 1968, the manufacturing rights would be sold to Israeli Aircraft Industries (IAI), now Israel Aerospace Industries, which manufactured the jets under the name Westwind.
Lee Harvey Oswald used the alias "A. J. Hidell" for the first time, ordering a .38 caliber Smith & Wesson revolver through the mail from Seaport Traders, Inc., of Los Angeles. He would use the Hidell name in ordering other weapons, including the Mannlicher–Carcano rifle that would be used in November to kill U.S. President Kennedy.
Born: Søren Gade, former Danish Defence Minister, in Holstebro
Died: Princess Adisaya Suriyabha, 73, member of the Thai royal family (a daughter of Chulalongkorn, King Rama V of Siam)

January 28, 1963 (Monday)
African American student Harvey Gantt entered Clemson University in South Carolina, the last U.S. state to hold out against racial integration.  "South Carolina is the only state," the Associated Press reported, "which, to this day, had preserved segregation in public schools at all levels."   Gantt's entry into the university was described as peaceful, and it was reported that "On the surface, Gantt was being treated by students and college officials alike as just another newcomer."  Most South Carolina public schools did not integrate until the 1970s.
The fourth, and final, book by author J. D. Salinger was published.  Raise High the Roof Beam, Carpenters and Seymour: An Introduction were two novellas put together in one novel, which had both previously appeared in print in the magazine The New Yorker.
The city of Vista, California, was incorporated.
Castell Coch, near Cardiff, Wales, UK, was made a Grade I listed building.
Died: John Farrow, 58, Australian born American film director, winner of 1957 Academy Award for his screenplay in Around the World in Eighty Days.

January 29, 1963 (Tuesday)
After having signaled the intentions of President Charles de Gaulle earlier, France vetoed the United Kingdom's application for entry into the European Common Market. In that admission to the Common Market would have required a unanimous vote of the member nations, Foreign Minister Maurice Couve de Murville moved to adjourn negotiations indefinitely. The U.K. would be admitted to the Common Market on January 1, 1973, almost ten years later.
The first inductees into the Pro Football Hall of Fame at Canton, Ohio, were announced.
At a launch guidance and control coordination meeting on January 29 and 30, Aerospace described three Titan II development flight failures that had been caused by problems in the General Electrical Mod III airborne radio guidance system. Although these failures did not appear to be the result of inherent design faults that might react on the Gemini program, Aerospace felt that a tighter quality assurance program was needed: "GE has a poor MOD III (G) quality control program, basically poor workmanship."
Born: Octavian Teodorescu, Romanian rock musician and composer who performs under the stage name "Octave"; in Bucharest
Died: 
Robert Frost, 88, popular American poet and four-time Pulitzer Prize winner
Lee "Specs" Meadows, 68, American MLB baseball pitcher who led the National League in wins in 1926 and who was one of the first players to wear glasses while playing

January 30, 1963 (Wednesday)
The U.S. State Department took the unusual step of issuing a press release critical of one of America's closest allies, in rebuttal to the speech by Canadian Prime Minister Diefenbaker about his nation's Canadian nuclear policy. Responding to Diefenbaker's January 25 statement that the two nations had been negotiating for "two to three months or more", the U.S. statement said that "the Canadian Government has not as yet proposed any arrangement sufficiently practical to contribute effectively to North American defense". Diefenbaker accused the U.S. of interfering with Canada's domestic affairs and temporarily recalled the Canadian ambassador from Washington. U.S. Secretary of State Dean Rusk would issue an apology two days later for the tone of the comments, which The New York Times described as "ill-considered and unusually blunt".
Gemini Project Office asked NASA Headquarters for authorization to use preflight automatic checkout equipment for Project Gemini. (NASA initially referred to preflight automatic checkout equipment by the acronym "PACE", but the use of the acronym would subsequently be dropped at the insistence of a computer company claiming prior rights to the name.) The Mercury Program had been successful in everything except meeting schedules, in which lengthy checkout time was a major obstacle. Automatic checkout equipment could cut down the time required to test components in Gemini. After reviewing this request, George M. Low, Director of Spacecraft and Flight Missions, Office of Manned Space Flight, asked that four automatic checkout stations be provided for Project Gemini as quickly as possible. Initially approved, the use of automatic checkout equipment in the Gemini program would subsequently be dropped as an economy measure.
Died:  
Edward A. Carter, Jr., 46, African-American U.S. Army sergeant who would be posthumously given the Medal of Honor for his heroism shown on March 23, 1945. Carter, unfairly accused of being a Communist, was shunned by the Army after World War II, and the medal would not be voted for him by Congress until 34 years after his death.
Francis Poulenc, 64, French composer
Sir Pelham Warner, 89, English cricketer known as "The Grand Old Man of English Cricket"; English National team captain in 1903-04 and 1905–06; President of MCC; author and founder of The Cricketer magazine

January 31, 1963 (Thursday)
The UK cargo ship Crescence ran aground at Winterton-on-Sea, Norfolk.
Major General H. W. G. Wijeyekoon left office as Commander of the Ceylon Army.

References

External links

1963
1963-01
1963-01